The 1975 Cal State Northridge  Matadors football team represented California State University, Northridge as a member of the California Collegiate Athletic Association (CCAA) during the 1975 NCAA Division II football season. Led by Gary Torgeson in his third and final season as head coach, Cal State Northridge compiled an overall record of 4–6–1 with a mark of 1–3 in conference play, placing fourth in the CCAA. The team outscored its opponents 166 to 164 for the season. The Matadors played home games at North Campus Stadium in Northridge, California.

Schedule

Team players in the NFL
The following Cal State Northridge players were selected in the 1976 NFL Draft.

References

Cal State Northridge
Cal State Northridge Matadors football seasons
Cal State Northridge Matadors football